Wolfgang Kieling (16 March 1924 – 7 October 1985) was a German actor.

Biography
In films since childhood in his native Germany, Kieling appeared in a few American films, notably in Alfred Hitchcock's Torn Curtain (1966), where he played Gromek, an East German agent brutally slain by Paul Newman's character.  He also played Gromek's brother in a scene that was deleted from the final print.

Kieling had a small role in $ (aka, The Heist, 1971), starring Warren Beatty. In a British film, Amsterdam Affair (1968), he portrayed the fictional Dutch detective Van der Valk several years before Barry Foster (another Hitchcock alumnus) was cast in the same role for the British TV series. He did much work on West German TV, including the first episode of Derrick ("Waldweg", 1974).

The best of his later roles was in the film Out of Order (1984), originally titled Abwärts. In the German-language version of Disneys Alice in Wonderland he dubbed the Mad Hatter.

Early on, Kieling also became a dubbing actor for West German dubs of foreign films, serving as the standard dubbing voice of Glenn Ford, Frank Sinatra (in his 1950s films), and he also dubbed Charlton Heston in the first part of the Planet of the Apes franchise. Thanks to his voice's similarity to that of Gert Günther Hoffmann, he would also replace Hoffmann as the dubbing voice of Paul Newman when Hoffmann was not available. On TV, he was especially known as the German voice of Bert (see Bert and Ernie) from Sesame Street up until his death in 1985.

In October 1952 his wife Jola Jobst (ex-wife of German Luftwaffe ace Hermann Graf), whom he had married in 1950, committed suicide.

In March 1968 he moved from West Germany to East Germany because of West German support for the United States, which he became disillusioned with after witnessing the Watts riots firsthand during the filming of Torn Curtain. After defecting he called the United States "the most dangerous enemy of humanity in the world today" with its "crimes against the Negro and the people of Vietnam."

Kieling moved back to West Germany in 1971.

Selected filmography

Child actor

 Die lustigen Weiber (1936) - Bit Part (uncredited)
 Maria the Maid (1936) - Christoph - Marias little brother
 Die Kreutzersonate (1937) - Wassja
 Heimweh (1937) - Robby, Sohn des Bankpräsidenten
 Women for Golden Hill (1938) - Pat
  (1938, released 1947) - Der Solist im Schulchor
 The Journey to Tilsit (1939) - Klein Franz
 Seitensprünge (1940) - Hotelboy
 Falstaff in Vienna (1940) - Loisl - Lehrling bei Meister Sturm
 Herz geht vor Anker (1940) - Schiffsjunge
 Somewhere in Berlin (1941) - Bürolehrling bei Dr. Horn
  (1941) - Hotelpage im "Tivoli" (uncredited)

Actor

 Genesung (1956) - Friedel Walter
 Damals in Paris (1956) - René
 Duped Till Doomsday (1957) - Gefreiter Lick
 The Man Who Couldn't Say No (1958) - Untersuchungsrichter
  (1959) - Dr. Stein
 Agatha, Stop That Murdering! (1960) - Philip
  (1961) - Dr. Salbach
 The Marriage of Mr. Mississippi (1961) - Narrator (voice, uncredited)
 The Last of Mrs. Cheyney (1961) - Dimanche
  (1961) - Kriminalinspektor Arnold
  (1963) - Schwarzkopf
 Time of the Innocent (1964)
  (1964) - Hauptwachtmeister Glantz
  (1964, TV film) - Möbius
 The House in Karp Lane (1965) - Karl Marek
 Hotel der toten Gäste (1965) - Jack Courtney
 The Bandits of the Rio Grande (1965) - Barran
 Our Man in Jamaica (1965) - Elmer Hayes / Nick
 Duel at Sundown (1965) - Punch
  (1966) - Napoleon's double
 Torn Curtain (1966) - Hermann Gromek
  (1966, TV film) - George Rogers
 Hotel Clausewitz (1967) - Stemmka
 The Vengeance of Fu Manchu (1967) - Dr. Lieberson
 Dead Run (1967) - Wolfgang
 The House of 1,000 Dolls (1967) - Inspector Emil
 Operazione San Pietro (1967) - Poulain
 Im Banne des Unheimlichen (1968) - Sir Cecil
 Tevye and His Seven Daughters (1968) - Poperilli
 Amsterdam Affair (1968) - Van Der Valk
 Das siebente Jahr (1969) - Günter Heim
 Jungfer, Sie gefällt mir (1969) - Adam
  (1970) - Böttcher (segment "Das Duell")
 Goya or the Hard Way to Enlightenment (1971) - Godoy
 $ (1971) - Granich
 Tatort:  (1972, TV series episode) - Dr. Rudolf Kühne
 Sonderdezernat K1: Vier Schüsse auf den Mörder (1972, TV series episode) - Siegfried Kalweit
  (1972) - Ferencz
  (1972, TV film) - Mr. Timm
  (1973, TV miniseries) - Gebhardt
  (1973, TV film) - Alfred Bergmann
 Vreemde Wêreld (1974) - Iwan Elzer
 Derrick: Waldweg (1974, TV series episode) - Rudolf Manger
  (1974, TV miniseries) - Martin Melchior
  (1976, TV film) - Anselm Kiwitt
  (1977, TV film) - Heaton
 Der Geist der Mirabelle (1978, TV film) - Harms
  (1979) - Edmund Gabriel
 Die Stühle des Herrn Szmil (1979, TV film) - Kasch
 Tatort: Schweigegeld (1979, TV series episode) - Helmuth Klaven
 A Guru Comes (1980, TV film) - Lawyer / Narrator
 Exil (1981, TV miniseries) - Gingold
  (1981, TV film) - Prof. Jacob Paul von Gundling
  (1981, TV film) - Ingelmann
  (1983, TV miniseries) - Martin Oppermann
 The Old Fox: Der vierte Mann (1983, TV series episode) - Helmut Schäffert
 Satan ist auf Gottes Seite (1983, TV film) - Carow
 The Heart of the Matter (1983, TV film) - Yusef
 Man Under Suspicion (1984) - Reporter 'Watergate'
 Out of Order (1984) - Gössmann
 The Old Fox: Der Klassenkamerad (1984, TV series episode) - Walter Nolle
 Patrik Pacard (1984, TV miniseries) - Professor Olaf Gunström
 Der Schiedsrichter (1985, TV film) - Karl Bisst
  (1985) - Notar Prätorius
 The Black Forest Clinic (1985–1986, TV series, 4 episodes) - Dr. Ignaz Marker

References

External links

 
 

1924 births
1985 deaths
German prisoners of war in World War II
German male film actors
German male television actors
German male child actors
Male actors from Berlin
20th-century German male actors
German Film Award winners
Burials at the Ohlsdorf Cemetery
German expatriate male actors in the United States